Fasayil or Fasa'il is a Palestinian village in the northeastern West Bank, a part of the Jericho Governorate, located  northwest of Jericho and about  southeast of Nablus. The closest Palestinian locality is Duma to the west. The village is located 2 km south of the Israeli settlement of Petza'el. According to the 2007 census by the Palestinian Central Bureau of Statistics (PCBS), the village had a population of 1,078.

History

Antiquity
The village's ancient name derived from a tower that Herod the Great, the king of Judea (Roman province), built in the Jordan Valley north of Jericho in dedication to his elder brother Phasael.<ref>Josephus, Jewish War 1.21.9;</ref> This has led to the belief that Herod founded Phasaelis.Conder and Kitchener, 1883, SWP III, p. 388  It was mentioned by Jewish historian and commander in the First Jewish-Roman War Josephus as being south of Archelais and was part of a toparchy ruled by Herod's sister Salome I. It is also found on the Map of Madaba surrounded by date palms. The tomb of an anchorite named Peter was found in the village in 1949.

The ruins of a monastery dedicated to Saint Cyriacus, a commemorated monk who died 556 CE, is also located in al-Fasayil. Among the ruins on the site is a large square building, of which now only the outline is visible, because it is almost completely buried. At the mouth of the nearby Wadi al-Fasayil, in a little mound, there is a birkeh ("pool") and many unexcavated remains of walls. The site is called Tell Sheikh ad-Diab because of a tomb of this personage, still in good condition.

A  stone found at Fasayil commemorates a building project there dedicated to  Khumarawayh ibn Ahmad ibn Tulun. It must have been started either during his rule, or the rule of his son, Abu 'l-Asakir Jaysh ibn Khumarawayh, that is between 884 and 896 CE.

It was mentioned by a monk named Brocardus in the 13th century as being a small village called Pheselch and in the 14th century by Marino Sanuto as being a small village by the name of Fasaelis. Victor Guérin visited in 1870, and found the place in ruins. In 1874, the PEF's Survey of Western Palestine'' visited and described the extensive ruins there.

Modern era

Since the Six-Day War in 1967, Fasayil has been under Israeli occupation.

Modern-day Fasayil consists of three parts: Fasayil al-Tahta, Fasayil al-Fauqa and Fasayil al-Wusta. The latter was established in 1998 by Bedouins who had been evicted by the Israeli authorities from their original lands in the Tel Arad region of the Negev Desert in the 1940s and 1950s. Many of the inhabitants are registered as residents of the Bethlehem Governorate and not Jericho. Fasayil was part of the Nablus Governorate until 1995 when it became a part of the Jericho Governorate.

According to ARIJ,  Israel have  confiscated land from Fasayil in order to construct four Israeli settlements:
1,049 dunams of land were taken for Tomer,
858 dunams were taken for Gilgal,
1,242  dunams were taken for Peza’el,
215  dunams were taken for Nativ HaGdud.

In 2006, Israeli authorities demolished 15 shelters in Fasayil al-Wusta, and in 2008 an additional 6 were demolished. Fasayil gained international attention when in 2007 the Israel Defense Forces planned on demolishing the village's primary school. Since Fasayil al-Wusta  is located in Area C of the West Bank, Israel has complete control over that part of the village, and granting building permits are authorized by them; the school was built without a permit. Residents often complain about the rarity of Israel permitting construction in Fasayil al-Wusta.

Demographics
In the tables of the 1931 census, the population of Fasayil was included with that of Aqraba, as it also was in the  1945 statistics.  The Jordanian census of 1961 recorded 318 residents.

In a census conducted by Israel after it occupied the West Bank in the 1967 Six-day War, Fasayil was reported to have 422 residents in 92 households, including 257 persons in 53 households whose head was a refugee from Israeli territory.

According to a census taken by the Palestinian Central Bureau of Statistics, Fasayil had a population of 648 in 1997, of which 31% were refugees fleeing other parts of the West Bank in the 1967 Six-Day War. The gender make-up was approximately 50% male and 50% female.

There were 1,078 inhabitants and 214 buildings in the 2007 census.

References

Bibliography

 (said to be haunted: p. 404)

 

 

  (p. 255 )
 (p.  48)

External links
Survey of Western Palestine, Map 15:    IAA, Wikimedia commons
 Fasayil Village,  Applied Research Institute–Jerusalem, ARIJ
 Fasayil Village Profile, ARIJ
 Fasayil aerial photo, ARIJ
Locality Development Priorities and Needs in Fasayil, Applied Research Institute-Jerusalem

Villages in the West Bank
Municipalities of the State of Palestine